The Far-Right Extremism in Europe Initiative (The FREE Initiative) is an online resource for practitioners responding to far-right extremism and violence. It was founded with support from the European Commission Prevention of and Fight Against Crime Programme, and a project led by the Ministry of Justice (Sweden) in partnership with the Ministry of Social Affairs (Denmark), Ministry of Security and Justice (Netherlands), Royal Norwegian Ministry of Justice and Public Safety, and the Ministry of the Interior (Finland). It was the first project endorsed by governments and funded by the European Commission solely on far-right extremism and radicalisation in the aftermath of the 2011 Norway attacks perpetrated by a far-right terrorist Anders Behring Breivik. The online resource launched on 1 September 2014.

Aims
The FREE Initiative initially involved ten European countries pooling and sharing their knowledge and understanding of the extreme right-wing threat.

Publicity
The resource was endorsed by Cecilia Malmström, former EU Commissioner for Home Affairs, who stated "Right-wing extremism is increasing right now and it is very worrying. We see it in almost all countries. It is important now to stand up for our values."

Birgitta Ohlsson, Minister for EU Affairs and Democracy Policy publicly stated: "As responsible Minister for democracy policy as well as for European affairs, I am glad that Sweden is leading a comprehensive project in order to collect good practice from across Europe how to prevent and counter the violence-promoting far-right...It is our sincere aim and hope that this project will contribute to a lasting network of practitioners across all the member states of the European Union and that these violent environments, who know of no borders, may be countered jointly."

In a speech to the Committee on the Elimination of Racial Discrimination, Jasenko Selimovic, Former Swedish State Secretary describes the project as "aiming to identify, collect and disseminate best practice regarding the prevention and the countering of far-right extremism across Europe."

Former Norwegian Minister of Justice and Public Security Grete Faremo publicly stated, "I believe this is a very important initiative which will provide valuable insight about the nature of the threat as well as effective ways of responding to the threat. And I am grateful for the possibility for Norway to participate in this project."

Films
The FREE Initiative includes videos with former perpetrators of far-right extremism and survivors of far-right violence, including Bjørn Ihler, a survivor of the 22 July attacks in Norway and a peace activist, who has gone on to tell his story more widely.

Policy guidance
The FREE Initiative has produced country context reports, a policy recommendations report, and a practitioners’ handbook. According to the Guardian, European policymakers from 10 countries met on 13 February 2014 at a meeting hosted by the Swedish Ministry of Justice to discuss policy recommendations from The FREE Initiative.

Financing
The project was awarded EUR 252,760.54 by the European Commission.

References

Far-right politics
Anti-fascism
Organizations established in 2014
Organisations associated with the European Commission